Stuart Housley (15 September 1948 – 24 August 2021) was an English professional footballer who played as a winger.

After leaving Grimsby Town, Housley joined Southern League side Yeovil Town for whom he made 399 appearances and scored 60 goals in eight seasons. Housley also spent short spells playing for Weymouth and Westland Sports. He returned to Yeovil in the 1990s under manager Graham Roberts and became the club's youth team manager a role he remained in until 2009. Housley worked with 13 managers at Yeovil, and spent 27 years involved with the club in various roles as a player, youth team coach and manager, kit man and video analyst, finally ending his association with the club in 2015.

Housley died in August 2021, aged 72.

References

1948 births
2021 deaths
Footballers from Doncaster
English footballers
Association football wingers
Grimsby Town F.C. players
Yeovil Town F.C. players
Weymouth F.C. players
Westland Sports F.C. players
Yeovil Town F.C. non-playing staff
Shaftesbury Town F.C. managers
English Football League players
English football managers